Dolichoderus satanus is a species of ant in the genus Dolichoderus. Described by Bolton in 1995, the species is endemic to Brazil.

References

Dolichoderus
Hymenoptera of South America
Insects described in 1995